Camaena is a genus of air-breathing, Asian land snails in the family Camaenidae.

Species
Species within the genus Camaena include:

 Camaena amphicora (Mabille, 1888)
 Camaena billeti (H. Fischer, 1898)
 Camaena choboensis (Mabille, 1889)
 Camaena chuongi Thach, 2016
 Camaena cicatricosa (O. F. Müller, 1774)
 Camaena connectens Dautzenberg & H. Fischer, 1906
 Camaena contractiva (Mabille, 1889)
 Camaena cossignanii Thach, 2020
 Camaena delsaerdti Thach & F. Huber, 2018
 Camaena detianensis Zhou & Lin, 2016
 Camaena ducae Thach, 2017
 Camaena dugasti (Morlet, 1892)
 Camaena funingensis W.-C. Zhou, P. Wang & J.-H. Lin, 2020
 Camaena gabriellae (Dautzenberg & d'Hammonville, 1887)
 Camaena gaolongensis W.-C. Zhou, P. Wang & J.-H. Lin, 2020
 Camaena haematozona (Heude, 1882)
 Camaena hahni (Mabille, 1887)
 Camaena hainanensis (H. Adams, 1870)
 Camaena hemiclista (Schmacker & O. Boettger, 1894)
 Camaena hoabinhensis Thach, 2016
 Camaena huberi Thach, 2017
 Camaena illustris (L. Pfeiffer, 1863)
 Camaena inflata (Möllendorff, 1885)
 Camaena lagunae (Hidalgo, 1887)
 Camaena leonhardti (Möllendorff, 1888)
 Camaena lingyunensis Zhou & Lin, 2016
 Camaena liqianae J. Jiang, W.-B. Wu & J. He, 2014
 Camaena longsonensis (Morlet, 1891)
 Camaena marmorivaga (Mabille, 1889)
 Camaena massiei (Morlet, 1891)
 Camaena melanotrica (Mabille, 1888)
 Camaena menglunensis D.-N. Chen & G.-Q. Zhang, 1999
 Camaena mirifica (Bavay & Dautzenberg, 1908)
 Camaena ngocthachi F. Huber, 2020
 Camaena ninhbinhensis Thach, 2016
 Camaena noetlingi (E. von Martens, 1897)
 Camaena obtecta (H. Fischer, 1898)
 Camaena ochthoplax (Benson, 1860)
 Camaena onae Thach, 2016
 Camaena pachychila Pilsbry, 1893
 Camaena philippinensis (C. Semper, 1873)
 Camaena polyzonatum D.-N., Chen & G.-Q. Zhang, 1999
 Camaena poyuensis Zhou, Wang & Ding, 2016
 Camaena rugata Möllendorff, 1899
 Camaena seraphinica (Heude, 1889)
 Camaena stolidota Quadras & Möllendorff, 1894
 Camaena subgibbera (Möllendorff, 1885)
 Camaena thanhhoaensis Thach, 2016
 Camaena vanbuensis E. A. Smith, 1896
 Camaena vayssierei (Bavay & Dautzenberg, 1909)
 Camaena vorvonga (Bavay & Dautzenberg, 1900)
 Camaena vulpis (Gredler, 1887)

Taxon inquirendum
 Camaena gudei Schepman, 1919

References

External links
 Albers, J. C. (1850). Die Heliceen nach natürlicher Verwandtschaft systematisch geordnet. Berlin: Enslin. 262 pp
 Albers, J. C.; Martens, E. von. (1860). Die Heliceen nach natürlicher Verwandtschaft systematisch geordnet von Joh. Christ. Albers. Zweite Ausgabe. I-XVIII, 1-359. Leipzig: Engelman
 Nevill, G. (1878). Hand List of Mollusca in the Indian Museum, Calcutta. Part I. Gastropoda. Pulmonata and Prosobranchia-Neurobranchia, xv + 338 pp. [> 1 December. Calcutta (Office of the Superintendent of Government Printing)]

Camaenidae